Larry Alexander may refer to:

 Larry Alexander (journalist), American journalist and military historian
 Larry Alexander (politician) (1950–2012), American politician
 Larry D. Alexander (born 1953), American artist, Christian author and teacher
Larry Alexander (comics), see Straw Man (comics)
Lawrence Alexander (basketball) (born 1991), American basketball player
Lawrence A. Alexander (born 1943), American law professor